Mutton Lane Cemetery, officially known as St Mary's Cemetery, is a cemetery in Mutton Lane, Potters Bar, Hertfordshire, that is associated with nearby St Mary the Virgin and All Saints church. The cemetery includes a garden of remembrance for prisoners of war.

History
In 1909 a gothic-style lychgate was built on the northern side of the cemetery which is locally listed by Hertsmere Borough Council.

The cemetery contains thirteen Commonwealth war graves of service personnel, three from World War I and ten from World War II.

The cemetery was closed to new burials in the 1970s, however, ashes may still be interred there.

Records relating to the cemetery are held at Hertfordshire Archives and Local Studies.

References

External links

 Ezitis.myzen.co.uk
 

Cemeteries in Hertfordshire
Potters Bar